Ikrimah (meaning Dove) is an Arabic name.

People named  Ikrimah include:
Ikrimah ibn Abi-Jahl, a known early Muslim leader and companion of Muhammad, 
Ikrimah, one of Ali's famous partisans, praised by Shi'as.

Arabic masculine given names